The 2012–13 Football League (known as the npower Football League for sponsorship reasons) was the 114th season of the Football League. It began in August 2012 and concluded in May 2013, with the promotion play-off finals.
The Football League is contested through three Divisions: the Championship, League One and League Two. The winner and the runner up of the League Championship are automatically promoted to the Premier League and they will are joined by the winner of the Championship playoff. The bottom two teams in League Two are relegated to the Conference Premier.

Promotion and relegation

From Premier League
 Relegated to Championship
 Bolton Wanderers
 Blackburn Rovers
 Wolverhampton Wanderers

From Championship
 Promoted to Premier League
 Reading
 Southampton
 West Ham United

 Relegated to League One
 Portsmouth
 Coventry City
 Doncaster Rovers

From League One
 Promoted to Championship
 Charlton Athletic
 Sheffield Wednesday
 Huddersfield Town

 Relegated to League Two
 Wycombe Wanderers
 Chesterfield
 Exeter City
 Rochdale

From League Two
 Promoted to League One
 Swindon Town
 Shrewsbury Town
 Crawley Town
 Crewe Alexandra

 Relegated to Conference Premier
 Hereford United
 Macclesfield Town

From Conference Premier
 Promoted to League Two
 Fleetwood Town
 York City

Championship

Table

Play-offs

Results

League One

Table

Play-offs

Results

League Two

Table

Play-offs

Results

Managerial changes

References

External links
Football League website
BBC Sport

 
2012-13
2012–13 in English football leagues